Vidigal may refer to:
Vidigal (favela) - A Rio de Janeiro favela

Vidigal is a surname, and may also refer to the following footballing brothers:
Beto Vidigal, retired Angolan midfielder;
Lito Vidigal, retired Angolan defender;
José Luís Vidigal, retired Portuguese-Angolan midfielder;
Toni Vidigal, retired Portuguese-Angolan midfielder;
Jorge Filipe Vidigal, Portuguese-Angolan defender.
Edson Vidigal, Brazilian politician and lawyer.